Mostowski Palace is an 18th-century palace in Warsaw, Poland, located at ul. Nowolipie 2 (2 Nowolipie Street) — prior to World War II, at ul. Przejazd 15.

History

The palace had been built in 1762-65 in the Baroque style for the Voivode of Minsk, .

In 1795 it became, by inheritance, the property of Tadeusz Mostowski, a prominent figure of revolutionary Poland.

The palace was purchased by the government and rebuilt in 1823-24 in the classicist style to a design by Antonio Corazzi. The building became the seat of Congress Poland's Commission of Internal Affairs and Police, and a venue of concerts by Fryderyk Chopin.

In 1831 the palace was taken over for the needs of the Russian Army.

Renovated in 1920, it became the seat of various municipal offices. During World War II, in 1944, it was destroyed by the Germans, except for the facade. After the war, in 1949, the Mostowski Palace was rebuilt. It is now the seat of Warsaw's police headquarters.

See also

 Staszic Palace
 Kazimierzowski Palace

References

External links
  Pałac Mostowskich 
  warszawa1939, Pałac Mostowskich

Palaces in Warsaw
Houses completed in 1765
Neoclassical architecture in Warsaw
Rebuilt buildings and structures in Poland